Francisco Derek Campos (born April 1, 1988) is an American professional mixed martial artist currently competing in the Featherweight division. A professional competitor since 2009, Campos has competed for Bellator MMA, Shark Fights and King of the Cage, and is the former King of the Cage Light Welterweight Champion.

Background
Originally from Lubbock, Texas, Campos competed in high school football and first began training in boxing and wrestling at the age of 19.

Mixed martial arts career

Early career
After a 2–0 amateur career, Campos started his professional career in 2009, fighting exclusively for Texas and Louisiana-based promotions.

In 2012, with a record of 9–2, Campos signed with Bellator.

Bellator MMA
Campos made his promotional debut against Rich Clementi on May 25, 2012 at Bellator 70. He lost via submission due to a guillotine choke in the first round.

Campos faced Brandon Girtz on June 19, 2013 at Bellator 96. He won via unanimous decision (29-28, 29-28, 29-28).

Campos faced Martin Stapleton on November 8, 2013 at Bellator 107. Once again he won via unanimous decision.

Campos was expected to rematch Brandon Girtz in the quarterfinal match of Bellator Season Ten Lightweight Tournament on March 21, 2014 at Bellator 113. However, his opponent was changed and he faced Tim Welch.  He won the fight via unanimous decision. Campos faced Patricky Freire in the semifinals at Bellator 117 and lost the bout via TKO in the second round.

Campos faced Estevan Payan on September 26, 2014 at Bellator 126. He won the fight via knockout just 31 seconds into the first round.

Stepping in for a recently retired John Gunderson, Campos was expected to face Alexander Sarnavskiy at Bellator 128 on October 10, 2014. However, an injury forced Campos out of the bout. Dakota Cochrane stepped in as a replacement.

Campos faced former Bellator Lightweight Champion Michael Chandler on June 19, 2015 at Bellator 138. He lost the fight via submission in the first round.

Campos finally rematched Brandon Girtz at Bellator 146 on November 20, 2015.  He lost the fight via knockout in the first round.

Campos next faced Melvin Guillard on February 19, 2016 at Bellator 149. He won the fight via a flurry of punches in the second round, resulting in a TKO victory.

Campos faced up-and-coming Djamil Chan at Bellator 161 on September 16, 2016. In the first round, Campos was almost finished by a series of punches after absorbing a punch on the feet. However, he survived the onslaught and went on to win the fight via unanimous decision.

Campos faced Derek Anderson at Bellator 170 on January 21, 2017. He won the fight via unanimous decision. 

Campos was expected to face Patricky Freire at Bellator 181 on July 14, 2017. The pair previously met at Bellator 117 on April 18, 2014 in the quarter final round of the Bellator season ten lightweight tournament, in which Campos was defeated via second-round TKO. The rematch was originally scheduled to take place at Bellator 167 on December 3, 2016, however an injury forced Freire out of the bout. During the Bellator 180 fight card, it was revealed by the promotion that Campos would instead face Brandon Girtz in a third fight at the event. Campos won the rubber match by TKO via doctor stoppage at the end of the second round due to cut on Girtz's forehead caused by a Campos knee.

Campos faced Patricky Freire in a rematch at Bellator 194 on February 16, 2018. He lost the fight via TKO in round one.

In his next fight, Campos moved down to Featherweight and faced Sam Sicilia at Bellator 212 on December 14, 2018. He lost the back-and-forth fight by split decision.

Campos next faced Pedro Carvalho at Bellator: Birmingham on May 4, 2019. He lost the bout by way of first round knockout.

Bellator Featherweight World Grand Prix
In the opening round of the Featherweight Grand Prix, Campos faced former two-time Bellator Featherweight world champion Daniel Straus at Bellator 226 on September 7, 2019. Campos went on to defeat Straus in a dominant unanimous decision win, with the judges scores reading 30–26, 30–25, 30–25.

In the quarterfinals, Campos faced A.J. McKee at Bellator 236 on December 21, 2019. He lost the bout via third round submission.

Post grand-prix
Campos was expected to face Roger Huerta at Bellator 246 on September 12, 2020. However, he ultimately faced Keoni Diggs at the event. At the weigh-ins, Diggs weighed in at 157 pounds, 1 pound over the non-title lightweight limit of 156 pounds. The bout proceeded at a catchweight with a percentage of Diggs' purse going to Campos. He lost the bout via a rear-naked choke submission in the third round.

On October 27, 2020, it was announced that Campos had been released from Bellator.

Post-Bellator career
After almost a decade in Bellator, Campos was scheduled to face Kyle Bochniak at XMMA2 on July 30, 2021. However, Campos withdrew from the bout due to an injury and was replaced by Marcus Brimage.

Championships and accomplishments

Mixed martial arts
King of the Cage
KOTC Light Welterweight Championship (One time)

Mixed martial arts record

|-
|Loss
|align=center| 20–11
|Keoni Diggs
|Technical Submission (rear-naked choke)
|Bellator 246
|
|align=center|3
|align=center|4:59
|Uncasville, Connecticut, United States
|
|-
|Loss
|align=center| 20–10
|A.J. McKee
|Submission (armbar)
|Bellator 236
|
|align=center|3
|align=center|1:08
|Honolulu, Hawaii, United States
|
|-
|Win
|align=center| 20–9
|Daniel Straus 
|Decision (unanimous)
|Bellator 226 
|
|align=center|3
|align=center|5:00
|San Jose, California, United States 
|
|-
|Loss
|align=center| 19–9
|Pedro Carvalho	
|TKO (punches)	
|Bellator: Birmingham
|
|align=center|1
|align=center|2:02
|Birmingham, England, United Kingdom
|
|-
|Loss
|align=center| 19–8
|Sam Sicilia
|Decision (split)
|Bellator 212
|
|align=center|3
|align=center|5:00
|Honolulu, Hawaii, United States
|
|-
|Loss
|align=center| 19–7
|Patricky Freire
|TKO (punches)
|Bellator 194
|
|align=center|1
|align=center|2:23
|Uncasville, Connecticut, United States
|
|-
|Win
|align=center| 19–6
|Brandon Girtz
|TKO (doctor stoppage)
| Bellator 181
|
|align=center|2
|align=center|5:00
|Thackerville, Oklahoma, United States
|
|-
|Win
|align=center| 18–6
|Derek Anderson
|Decision (unanimous)
| Bellator 170
|
|align=center|3
|align=center|5:00
|Inglewood, California, United States
|
|-
|Win
|align=center| 17–6
|Djamil Chan
|Decision (unanimous)
| Bellator 161
|
|align=center|3
|align=center|5:00
|Cedar Park, Texas, United States
|
|-
|Win
|align=center| 16–6
|Melvin Guillard
|KO (punches)
| Bellator 149
|
|align=center|2
|align=center|0:32
|Houston, Texas, United States
|
|-
| Loss
| align=center| 15–6
| Brandon Girtz
| KO (punches)
| Bellator 146
| 
| align=center|1 
| align=center|0:37
| Thackerville, Oklahoma, United States
| 
|-
| Loss
| align=center| 15–5
| Michael Chandler
| Submission (rear-naked choke)
| Bellator 138
| 
| align=center| 1
| align=center| 2:17
| St. Louis, Missouri, United States
| 
|-
| Win
| align=center| 15–4
| Estevan Payan
| KO (punch)
| Bellator 126
| 
| align=center| 1
| align=center| 0:31
| Phoenix, Arizona, United States
| 
|-
| Loss
| align=center| 14–4
| Patricky Freire
| TKO (punches)
| Bellator 117
| 
| align=center| 2
| align=center| 0:52
| Council Bluffs, Iowa, United States
| 
|-
| Win
| align=center| 14–3
| Tim Welch
| Decision (unanimous)
| Bellator 113
| 
| align=center| 3
| align=center| 5:00
| Mulvane, Kansas, United States
|  
|-
| Win
| align=center| 13–3
| Martin Stapleton
| Decision (unanimous)
| Bellator 107
| 
| align=center| 3
| align=center| 5:00
| Thackerville, Oklahoma, United States
| 
|-
| Win
| align=center| 12–3
| Brandon Girtz
| Decision (unanimous)
| Bellator 96
| 
| align=center| 3
| align=center| 5:00
| Thackerville, Oklahoma, United States
| 
|-
| Win
| align=center| 11–3
| Derrick Krantz
| Submission (rear-naked choke)
| Ascend Combat: Mayhem 3
| 
| align=center| 3
| align=center| 4:15
| Shreveport, Louisiana, United States
| 
|-
| Win
| align=center| 10–3
| Joe Condon
| TKO (punches)
| KOTC: Stranglehold
| 
| align=center| 3
| align=center| 1:56
| Thackerville, Oklahoma, United States
| 
|-
| Loss
| align=center| 9–3
| Rich Clementi
| Submission (guillotine choke)
| Bellator 70
| 
| align=center| 1
| align=center| 4:18
| New Orleans, Louisiana, United States
| 
|-
| Win
| align=center| 9–2
| Kota Okazawa
| Submission (neck crank)
| G1 Fights: Sovereign Valor
| 
| align=center| 2
| align=center| 3:46
| Kinder, Louisiana, United States
| 
|-
| Loss
| align=center| 8–2
| Scott Cleve
| Decision (split)
| Ultimate Warrior Fighting 1: Huerta vs. War Machine
| 
| align=center| 3
| align=center| 5:00
| Pharr, Texas, United States
| 
|-
| Win
| align=center| 8–1
| Marcus Andrusia
| TKO (punches)
| Global Fighting Alliance 15
| 
| align=center| 1
| align=center| 1:37
| Sulphur, Louisiana, United States
| 
|-
| Win
| align=center| 7–1
| Gilbert Jimenez
| Decision (unanimous)
| Triple A Promotions
| 
| align=center| 3
| align=center| 3:00
| Amarillo, Texas, United States
| 
|-
| Win
| align=center| 6–1
| Cody Pfister
| Submission (rear-naked choke)
| Undisputed MMA 1
| 
| align=center| 1
| align=center| 2:55
| Amarillo, Texas, United States
| 
|-
| Win
| align=center| 5–1
| Anselmo Luna
| Decision (unanimous)
| Shark Fights 11: Humes vs Buentello
| 
| align=center| 3
| align=center| 5:00
| Odessa, Texas, United States
| 
|-
| Loss
| align=center| 4–1
| Diego Brandão
| Decision (split)
| King of Kombat 8: The Uprising
| 
| align=center| 3
| align=center| 5:00
| Austin, Texas, United States
| 
|-
| Win
| align=center| 4–0
| Yosdenis Cedeno
| Submission
| Art of War: Mano A Mano
| 
| align=center| 3
| align=center| 1:59
| Mesquite, Texas, United States
| 
|-
| Win
| align=center| 3–0
| Adam Schindler
| Decision (unanimous)
| King of Kombat 6: Fists of Fury
| 
| align=center| 3
| align=center| 5:00
| Austin, Texas, United States
| 
|-
| Win
| align=center| 2–0
| Clay Shackleford
| KO (punch)
| Global Fighting Alliance: Mardi Gras Mayhem
| 
| align=center| 1
| align=center| 0:27
| Alexandria, Louisiana, United States
| 
|-
| Win
| align=center| 1–0
| Brandon Crick
| Submission (rear-naked choke)
| Xtreme Knockout 2
| 
| align=center| 2
| align=center| 0:35
| Arlington, Texas, United States
|

See also
 List of current mixed martial arts champions
 List of male mixed martial artists

References

1988 births
Living people
American male mixed martial artists
Mixed martial artists from Texas
Lightweight mixed martial artists
Mixed martial artists utilizing boxing
Mixed martial artists utilizing wrestling
Sportspeople from Lubbock, Texas